Francis Shane de Freitas (born 12 September 1977) is a Barbadian gymnast. He competed at the 1996 Summer Olympics.

References

External links
 

1977 births
Living people
Barbadian male artistic gymnasts
Olympic gymnasts of Barbados
Gymnasts at the 1996 Summer Olympics
Sportspeople from Bridgetown